Kim Ki-tai (Hangul: 김기태, Hanja: 金杞泰; born May 23, 1969) is a former South Korean baseball player who played for the Ssangbangwool Raiders, Samsung Lions and SK Wyverns and is a former manager of Kia Tigers in the KBO League. He is generally considered as the KBO's best-ever designated hitter.

Career
During his pro career, he was used primarily as a designated hitter, with occasional games at first base. He is a four-time KBO League Golden Glove Award-winner as well.

In , Kim was a member of the 2000 South Korean Olympic baseball team which won the bronze medal in the baseball tournament.

Kim managed the LG Twins from 2012 to 2014. In late 2014, Kim became the manager of the Kia Tigers. In 2017, Kim successfully lead the team to Korean Series and was considered the best manager in the KBO League. On May 16, 2019, he resigned as manager.

See also 
 List of KBO career home run leaders

References

External links 
 Profile at databaseOlympics.com
 Career statistics and player information from KBO League

 

1969 births
Living people
Baseball players at the 1990 Asian Games
Baseball players at the 2000 Summer Olympics
KBO League designated hitters
LG Twins coaches
LG Twins managers
Medalists at the 2000 Summer Olympics
Nippon Professional Baseball coaches
Olympic baseball players of South Korea
Olympic bronze medalists for South Korea
Olympic medalists in baseball
Samsung Lions players
SSG Landers coaches
SSG Landers players
South Korean baseball coaches
South Korean baseball managers
South Korean baseball players
South Korean expatriate baseball people in Japan
Sportspeople from Gwangju
Ssangbangwool Raiders players
Asian Games competitors for South Korea
South Korean Buddhists